Diary of an Uber Driver  is an Australian television comedy-drama series screened on ABC TV from 14 August 2019, based on a blog and e-book by Ben Phillips. The TV series was written by Thomas Ward and directed by Matthew Moore.

Plot
Diary of an Uber Driver follows Uber driver Ben as he transports a number of disparate characters to their destinations. The passengers display a range of behaviours, with each trip telling a part of their stories and evoking a range of reactions by Ben. Ben's background story unfolds as the series progresses, as he tries to prepare for impending unplanned fatherhood with the mother of his child, whom he hardly knows.

Cast
 Sam Cotton as Ben 
 Zahra Newman as Beck
 John Bell as Ken
 Caroline Brazier as Jodie
 Ed Oxenbould as Clint
 Julian Maroun as Mo
 Emily Barclay as Georgie
 Harry Cook as Mike Fisher
 Rajan Velu as Saad

Background and production
Ben Phillips' blog and e-book Diary of an Uber Driver was optioned for development as a TV series by RevLover Films' Martha Coleman. Thomas Ward, co-writer of and actor in Please Like Me, wrote the TV series after reading the blog, creating a different backstory for Ben but borrowing ideas from some of the stories of the passengers. Sam Cotton was recruited to play the lead character and Zahra Newman the mother of his unborn child.

The series was supported by Screen Australia, Create NSW and All3Media.

Episodes

References

Australian Broadcasting Corporation original programming
2019 Australian television series debuts
English-language television shows
Works about Uber